is the thirty-second single by Japanese recording artist Gackt, released on June 17, 2009. This single is the second of four singles of the countdown to Gackt's 10th anniversary as solo artist. This single has been titled The 2nd Heaven.

CD

Charts

References

2009 singles
Gackt songs
Songs written by Gackt
2009 songs